Holcocera villella is a moth in the  family Blastobasidae. It is found in the United States, including Maryland, Oregon, Maine and California.

The larvae feed on the seeds of Pinus species.

References

Moths described in 1900
villella